Ibrahimzai, also called Burhan, Boran or Brahim, are one of the two main branches of the Ghilji Pashtun tribal confederation. The other branch being the Toran.

References

Ghilji Pashtun tribes
Pashto-language surnames
Pakistani names